Fait Accompli is the twelfth studio album by American rapper Canibus. The album was released on June 10, 2014, by RBC Records. On June 3, 2014, the album's first single "Historic" featuring The HRSMN and Tragedy Khadafi was released.

Critical response

Martin Connor of HipHopDX gave the album three out of five stars, saying "One of the knocks on Canibus over the course of his solo career has been his ear for production. Unfortunately, Fait Accompli does nothing to remedy this opinion. Producer JP Beats and his martial sonic world, full as it is of hard-hitting military snare drums and pugilistic army marching chants, assist Canibus. But sonically, the project falls flat. A lack of variety and overall hollowness plagues each production, as the snares, kicks and low ends all suffer from a dated, cheap sound. Combined with the fact that Canibus largely gives you only this one apocalyptic look, and the lack of versatility in both his delivery and the production, Fait Accompli becomes an increasingly difficult listen."

Track listing 
All songs produced by JP Beats.

References

Canibus albums
2014 albums